Léa Serna (born 31 October 1999) is a French figure skater. She is the 2018 Ice Star silver medalist, the 2017 Denkova-Staviski Cup silver medalist, and two-time French national champion (2021–22).

Career 
Serna began learning to skate in 2007. She made her ISU Junior Grand Prix debut in September 2013.

In January 2015, she won bronze at the European Youth Olympic Winter Festival. In March, she competed at the 2015 World Junior Championships in Tallinn, Estonia; she qualified for the free skate and finished 20th overall.

Serna missed the 2015–16 season due to tendinitis in the patellar ligament.

In October 2017, she won her first senior international medal – silver at the Denkova-Staviski Cup in Sofia, Bulgaria. Ranked 38th in the short program, she did not advance to the free skate at the 2018 World Junior Championships in Sofia.

In October 2018, Serna won silver at the Ice Star in Minsk, Belarus. Her Grand Prix debut came in November at the 2018 Internationaux de France.

She began training in Poitiers with Brian Joubert in January 2019.

Programs

Competitive highlights 
GP: Grand Prix; CS: Challenger Series; JGP: Junior Grand Prix

References

External links 
 

1999 births
French female single skaters
Living people
People from Aubagne
Sportspeople from Bouches-du-Rhône